Ernest Sykes may refer to:

 Ernest Sykes (VC) (1885–1949), English recipient of the Victoria Cross
 Ernest Ruthven Sykes (1867–1954), British malacologist
 Ernest Sykes (cricketer) (1869–1925), English cricketer
 Ernie Sykes (1915–1997), English footballer
 Ernest Eugene Sykes (1867-1942), New Orleans businessman and Freemason